Difluoromethylenedioxyamphetamine (DiFMDA) is a substituted derivative of 3,4-methylenedioxyamphetamine (MDA), which was developed by Daniel Trachsel and coworkers, along with the corresponding fluorinated derivatives of MDMA, MDEA, BDB and MBDB, with the aim of finding a non-neurotoxic drug able to be used as a less harmful substitute for entactogenic drugs such as MDMA. Since a major route of the normal metabolism of these compounds is scission of the methylenedioxy ring, producing neurotoxic metabolites such as alpha-methyldopamine, it was hoped that the difluoromethylenedioxy bioisostere would show increased metabolic stability and less toxicity.

These compounds have not yet been tested in animals to verify whether they show similar pharmacological activity to the non-fluorinated parent compounds, although in vitro binding studies show DFMDA to have a SERT affinity in between that of MDA and MDMA. It is also now generally accepted that MDMA neurotoxicity results from a variety of different causes and is not solely due to accumulation of alpha-methyldopamine, making it unclear how much less neurotoxic DFMDA and related drugs would be in practice.

References

Substituted amphetamines
Designer drugs
Serotonin releasing agents
Organofluorides
Entactogens and empathogens